Joel Rueben Hitt Jr. (December 30, 1916 – June 2, 2003) was an American professional basketball and football player. He played in the National Basketball League for the Akron Goodyear Wingfoots during the 1939–40 season and averaged 0.7 points per game.

In football, he was selected in the 1939 NFL Draft by the Cleveland Rams (13th round, 113th overall). He played for them in three games that season and accumulated 54 total yards of offense in his brief NFL career.

References

1916 births
2003 deaths
Akron Goodyear Wingfoots players
American football ends
American men's basketball players
Basketball players from Mississippi
Centers (basketball)
Cleveland Rams players
Forwards (basketball)
Mississippi College Choctaws baseball players
Mississippi College Choctaws football players
Mississippi College Choctaws men's basketball players
People from Clinton, Mississippi
Players of American football from Mississippi